Prażmów may refer to the following places:
Prażmów, Łódź Voivodeship (central Poland)
Prażmów, Lublin Voivodeship (east Poland)
Prażmów, Masovian Voivodeship (east-central Poland)

See also
Prażmowo, a village in Giżycko County, Warmian-Masurian Voivodeship, in northern Poland